The PDC European Tour is a series of darts tournaments held across Europe organized by the Professional Darts Corporation. Starting in 2012 with five events, the number of events has steadily risen with eight held in 2013 and 2014, nine in 2015, ten in 2016, twelve in 2017, thirteen in both 2018 and 2019, and thirteen once more in 2020 (although that was reduced to four, owing to the COVID-19 pandemic), and only two events took place in 2021, with a return to thirteen events in 2022.

These events see the top players on the PDC ProTour Order of Merit compete against players from six different regional qualifiers. Currently the prize fund for each tournament is £175,000, with £30,000 going to the winner. These events differ from others held on the Pro Tour as they are played on one board in front of an audience. They are not televised, but are streamed on the PDC's subscription service.

Since 2016, the end of the European Tour marks the end of qualification for the European Championship, with the top 32 players on the European Tour Order of Merit comprising the field for the televised premier event.

Locations
Since its inception in 2012, the majority of PDC European Tour events have been held in Germany. The only exception being in 2021, when owing to the COVID-19 pandemic, the only two events held that year took place in Hungary and Gibraltar.

Prize money
Prize money for European Tour events rose to £175,000 in 2023. The prize fund has been divided as follows:

Active tournaments

Austrian Darts Open

German Darts Championship

European Darts Open

European Darts Grand Prix

International Darts Open

European Darts Matchplay

German Darts Open

German Darts Grand Prix

Dutch Darts Championship

Czech Darts Open

Hungarian Darts Trophy

Belgian Darts Open

Baltic Sea Darts Open

Former tournaments

UK Masters

German Darts Masters

European Darts Trophy

Danish Darts Open

Austrian Darts Championship

Dutch Darts Masters

Belgian Darts Championship

Gibraltar Darts Trophy

Records and statistics

Total finalist appearances

Nine-dart finishes
Thirteen nine-darters have been thrown on the European Tour. The first one was thrown by Michael Smith in the inaugural tournament in Austria in 2012.

After a gap of just over 5 years between nine-darters, the so-called "Curse of Ross Smith" hung over the European Tour, named after Smith, who got his in the 2013 Gibraltar Darts Trophy. Since Michael van Gerwen broke the curse at the 2018 European Darts Matchplay, there have been six more nine-dart finishes.

References

 

2012 establishments in Europe
European Tour